Sechura is a town in northwestern Peru,  south of Piura. It is the capital of Sechura Province in the Piura Region. The city lends its name to the Sechura Desert, which extends south along most of coastal Peru. Crescent dunes lie south of the city, between the sea and the highway.

The city has a main square with the Catédral de Sechura, built in the 18th century in the Spanish colonial style.  Because of the desert surrounding the city, the church has sometimes been called the Catédral de Arena (Sand Cathedral).

References

Populated places in the Piura Region